The 2007/08 season was the fifth year of the Elite One Championship, the top level rugby league competition in France. The season commenced on 6 October 2007 and like the previous season, there were 11 teams with one team missing a round each week. A total of 22 rounds were played, with the last finishing on 12 April 2008 before the play-offs, that determined who played in the Grand Final. RC Albi were the league's new club having been promoted from the Elite Two Championship. Pia XIII were the defending champions having beaten Lézignan Sangliers in the 2006/2007 season Grand Final. The top 8 clubs qualified for the end of season play-offs. In the first week of the play-offs, Saint-Gaudens Bears and UTC both easily beat Toulouse Olympique and RC Albi respectively. However both teams were then beaten, Saint-Gaudens Bears by third placed AS Carcassonne, and UTC by Limoux Grizzlies in  Week 2. Pia XIII beat AS Carcassonne in the first semi-final and a day later Lézignan Sangliers, the league leaders, squeezed past Limoux Grizzlies. In the Grand Final held at the Stade de la Mediterranee in Béziers, Lézignan Sangliers did what they had failed to do the previous season and beat Pia XIII 26-16, and thus winning the title for the first time. Despite finishing 8th and reaching the Lord Derby cup final RC Albi were relegated and Toulouse Olympique left the league and joined the English Rugby League system. SO Avignon were promoted from the 2nd tier. The Lord Derby Cup was won by Limoux Grizzlies.

Table 

Points win=3: draw=2: loss=1:

Results

Round 1 
 Albi Tigers 24-36 Toulouse Olympique
 Pia Donkeys 22-18 Lyon-Villeurbanne
 Carcassonne 30-20 UTC
 Villeneuve Leopards 52-12 Carpentras
 Lézignan Sangliers 30-14 Saint-Gaudens Bears

Round 2 
 Toulouse Olympique 19-14 Villeneuve Leopards
 Carcassonne 17-24 Pia Donkeys
 Saint-Gaudens Bears 44-0 Albi Tigers
 Carpentras 48-20 Lyon-Villeurbanne
 Limoux Grizzlies 31-18 Lézignan Sangliers

Round 3 
 Albi Tigers 30-18 Limoux Grizzlies
 Lyon-Villeurbanne 10-24 Toulouse Olympique
 Villeneuve Leopards 16-36 Saint-Gaudens Bears
 Carpentras 4-44 Carcassonne
 UTC 44-28 Pia Donkeys

Round 4 
 Carcassonne 37-12 Toulouse Olympique
 Lézignan Sangliers 46-18 Albi Tigers
 UTC 32-16 Carpentras
 Limoux Grizzlies 40-10 Villeneuve Leopards
 Lyon-Villeurbanne 12-16 Saint-Gaudens Bears

Round 5 
 Villeneuve Leopards 24-50 Lézignan Sangliers
 Pia Donkeys 86-4 Carpentras
 Saint-Gaudens Bears 24-20 Carcassonne
 Limoux Grizzlies 38-4 Lyon-Villeurbanne
 Toulouse Olympique 32-40 UTC

Round 6 
 Albi Tigers 36-12 Villeneuve Leopards
 Carcassonne 35-0 Limoux Grizzlies
 Lyon-Villeurbanne 24-34 Lézignan Sangliers
 Saint-Gaudens Bears 48-14 UTC
 Toulouse Olympique 12-38 Pia Donkeys

Round 7 
 Pia Donkeys 58-8 Saint-Gaudens Bears
 Lyon-Villeurbanne 22-16 Albi Tigers
 Carpentras 28-16 Toulouse Olympique
 Lézignan Sangliers 38-11 Carcassonne
 UTC 30-22 Limoux Grizzlies

Round 8 
 Carcassonne 50-30 Albi Tigers
 Villeneuve Leopards 30-14 Lyon-Villeurbanne
 Saint-Gaudens Bears 54-18 Carpentras
 UTC 24-40 Lézignan Sangliers
 Limoux Grizzlies 30-32 Pia Donkeys

Round 9 
 Toulouse Olympique 14-10 Saint-Gaudens Bears
 Albi Tigers 8-12 UTC
 Villeneuve Leopards 3-22 Carcassonne
 Lézignan Sangliers 22-4 Pia Donkeys
 Limoux Grizzlies 28-14 Carpentras

Round 10
 Toulouse Olympique 8-26 Limoux Grizzlies
 Pia Donkeys 27-4 Albi Tigers
 Carcassonne 37-12 Lyon-Villeurbanne
 UTC 66-6 Villeneuve Leopards
 Lézignan Sangliers 68-16 Carpentras

Round 11 
 Albi Tigers 35-8 Carpentras
 Pia Donkeys 10-6 Villeneuve Leopards
 Lyon-Villeurbanne 12-31 UTC
 Lézignan Sangliers 38-12 Toulouse Olympique
 Limoux Grizzlies 34-22 Saint-Gaudens Bears

Round 12 
 Toulouse Olympique 24-6 Albi Tigers
 Carpentras 28-10 Villeneuve Leopards
 Lyon-Villeurbanne 22-28 Pia Donkeys
 Saint-Gaudens Bears 18-36 Lézignan Sangliers
 UTC 10-28 Carcassonne

Round 13 
 Albi Tigers 18-38 Saint-Gaudens Bears
 Villeneuve Leopards 4-14 Toulouse Olympique
 Lyon-Villeurbanne 50-14 Carpentras
 Pia Donkeys 32-6 Carcassonne
 Lézignan Sangliers 52-12 Limoux Grizzlies

Round 14 
 Limoux Grizzlies 52-8 Albi Tigers
 Toulouse 28-10 Lyon-Villeurbanne
 Saint-Gaudens Bears 16-21 Villeneuve Leopards
 Carcassonne 74-14 Carpentras
 Pia Donkeys 30-20 UTC

Round 15 
 Albi Tigers 24-21 Lézignan Sangliers
 Saint-Gaudens Bears 12-14 Lyon-Villeurbanne
 Toulouse 10-19 Carcassonne
 Villeneuve Leopards 16-10 Limoux Grizzlies
 Carpentras 30-26 UTC

Round 16 
 Carcassonne 28-18 Saint-Gaudens Bears
 Lyon-Villeurbanne 18-16 Limoux Grizzlies
 UTC 28-4 Toulouse
 Lézignan Sangliers 66-6 Villeneuve Leopards
 Pia Donkeys 66-16 Carpentras

Round 17 
 Villeneuve Leopards 23-19 Albi Tigers
 Limoux Grizzlies 14-28 Carcassonne
 UTC 24-16 Saint-Gaudens Bears
 Lézignan Sangliers 50-26 Lyon-Villeurbanne
 Pia Donkeys 40-20 Toulouse

Round 18 
 Albi Tigers - Lyon-Villeurbanne
 Limoux Grizzlies 44-20 UTC
 Carcassonne 14-28 Lézignan Sangliers
 Saint-Gaudens Bears 22-20 Pia Donkeys
 Toulouse 36-20 Carpentras

Round 19 
 Albi Tigers 12-36 Carcassonne
 Lézignan Sangliers 42-34 UTC
 Pia Donkeys 48-16 Limoux Grizzlies 
 Carpentras 6-42 Saint-Gaudens Bears
 Lyon-Villeurbanne - Villeneuve Leopards

Round 20 
 UTC 14-12 Albi Tigers
 Pia Donkeys 26-30 Lézignan Sangliers
 Carpentras 9-54 Limoux Grizzlies
 Saint-Gaudens Bears 18-6 Toulouse
 Carcassonne 22-14 Villeneuve Leopards

Round 21 
 Albi Tigers 12-22 Pia Donkeys
 Lézignan Sangliers 56-10 Carpentras
 Villeneuve Leopards 26-36 UTC
 Limoux Grizzlies 42-8 Toulouse
 Lyon-Villeurbanne 24-20 Carcassonne

Round 22 
 Carpentras 22-14 Albi Tigers
 Villeneuve Leopards 16-22 Pia Donkeys 
 Toulouse 18-66 Toulouse
 UTC 70-12 Lyon-Villeurbanne
 Saint-Gaudens Bears 0-34 Limoux Grizzlies

Play-offs

Round 1

Round 2

Round 3

Final

Records

Club 

 Most Victories: Lézignan Sangliers; 18
 Least Victories: Albi Tigers, Lyon-Villeurbanne, Carpentras, Villeneuve Leopards; 5
 Best Offense: Lézignan Sangliers; 829
 Worst Offense: Villeneuve Leopards; 309
 Best Defense: Carcassonne; 343
 Worst Defense: Carpentras; 861
 Biggest Margin: R5 Pia Donkeys 86-4 Carpentras; 82pts
 Most Points: R5 Pia Donkeys 86-4 Carpentras; 90pts
 Least Points: R11 Pia Donkeys 10-6 Villeneuve Leopards; 16pts

Player 

 Top Points Scorer: Philip Ramage (Limoux Grizzlies); 238
 Top Try Scorer: Jared Taylor (Lézignan Sangliers); 34
 Top Conversion Scorer: Nicolas Munoz (Lézignan Sangliers); 98
 Top Drop-Kick Scorer: Frederic Banquet (Carcassonne); 4

See also 
 Elite One Championship V Grand Final
 Elite One Championship
 Rugby league in France
 Super League XII
 Super League XIII

Rugby league competitions in France
2007 in French rugby league
2008 in French rugby league